Jhelum is a city on the east bank of the Jhelum River, which is located in the district of Jhelum in the north of Punjab province, Pakistan. It is the 44th largest city of Pakistan by population. Jhelum is known for providing many soldiers to the British Army before independence, and later to the Pakistan armed forces – due to which it is also known as City of Soldiers or Land of Martyrs and Warriors.

Jhelum is a few miles upstream from the site of the ancient Battle of the Hydaspes between the armies of Alexander and King Porus. Possibly Jhelum City was the capital of Porus' Kingdom, Paurava. A city called Bucephala was founded nearby to commemorate the death of Alexander's horse, Bucephalus. Other notable sites nearby include the 16th-century Rohtas Fort, the Tilla Jogian complex of ancient temples, and the 16th-century Grand Trunk Road which passes through the city. According to the 2017 census of Pakistan, the population of Jhelum was 190,425. The name of the city is derived from the words Jal (pure water) and Ham (snow), as the water that flows through the river originates in the Himalayas. There are a number of industries in and around Jhelum city, including a tobacco factory, wood, marble, glass and flour mills.

Etymology
Anjum Sultan Shahbaz recorded some stories of the name Jhelum in his book Tareekh-e-Jhelum as:

History

Ancient
The Rajput, Gujjars, Jats, who now hold the Salt Range and its northern plateau respectively, appear to have been the earliest inhabitants of Jhelum. The next major point in the history of the district was the Battle of the Hydaspes between Alexander and the local ruler, Porus the Elder. Abisares (or Abhisara; in Greek Αβισαρης), called Embisarus (Eμ
Oβισαρoς) by Diodorus, was an Indian people king of abhira descent beyond the river Hydaspes, whose territory lay in the mountains, sent embassies to Alexander both before and after the conquest of Porus in 326 BC, although inclined to espouse the side of the latter. Alexander not only allowed him to retain his kingdom, but increased it, and on his death appointed his son as his successor. Porus' kingdom Paurava was on the left bank of the Jhelem River corresponding the limits of the present Gujrat District.The Gakhars appear to represent an early wave of conquerors from the west, and who still inhabit a large tract in the mountain north to tilla range. Gakhars were the dominant race during the early Muslim era and they long continued to retain their independence, both in Jhelum itself and in the neighbouring district of Rawalpindi.

Medieval
In 997 CE, Sultan Mahmud Ghaznavi, took over the Ghaznavid dynasty empire established by his father, Sultan Sebuktegin. In 1005 he conquered the Shahis in Kabul and followed it by the conquests of Punjab region including Jhelum. The Delhi Sultanate and later Mughal Empire ruled the region. The Punjab region became predominantly Muslim due to missionary Sufi saints whose dargahs dot the landscape of Punjab region.

The Mughals were Persianized Turks who claimed descent from both Timur and Genghis Khan and strengthened the Persianate culture of Muslim India. Being very few in number, main families of Mughal Barlas, the descent of Ameer-i Taimoor settled in Mong Rasool and afterward scattered to village chak Nazar, Shamaspur, Aima Afghana, khardiyala, Chak sikander, Malhar Muglain, Mota Garbi, Bhimber, they adopted a policy of converting the local Jats and Gakhars mandatory as recorded in the Baburnama. Thus it is credited to the Mughals, who were largely responsible for the conversion of the Jats to Islam.

With the collapse of the Mughal Empire after the death of Aurangzeb, the Durrani Empire had occupied the plains but were eventually ousted by the Sikhs.

Later periods
After the decline of the Mughal Empire, the region fell under Afghan occupation. During the decline of Afghan rule following the Third Battle of Panipat, the newly emerging Sikh Empire invaded and occupied Jhelum District in 1808 from its Gakhar ruler Raja Sultan Muqarrab Khan. In 1849 Jhelum passed with the rest of the Sikh territories to the British. In 1857 the 14th Native Infantry stationed at Jhelum town mutinied, and displayed a vigorous defence against a force sent from Rawalpindi to disarm them, but decamped for the night following the action, with the main body being subsequently arrested by the Kashmiri authorities, into whose territory they had escaped.

British Raj
During British rule, Jhelum was connected by the North-Western Railway to other cities in the Indian Empire, 1,367 miles from Calcutta, 1,413 from Bombay, and 849 from Karachi. The population according to the 1901 census of India was 14,951.

According to the Imperial Gazetteer of India:

During the Mutiny of 1857, 35 British soldiers of the Regular 24th Regiment of Foot were killed at the Battle of Jhelum by mutineers from the Honourable East India Companies 14th Bengal Native Infantry (roughly 500 of the soldiers mutinied with roughly 100 of the Sikh soldiers remaining loyal). Among the dead was Captain Francis Spring, the eldest son of Colonel William Spring. A lectern inside St. John's Church Jhelum shows the names of those 35 soldiers. St. John's Church is located in the Jhelum Cantonment, Pakistan beside the river Jhelum. It was built in 1860 and remains a landmark in the city. It was built as a Protestant church and was in use throughout the British period. For the past forty years, it has been closed to the public and in poor condition, however, it has since been renovated and reopened and is now maintained.

The British soldier William Connolly won a Victoria Cross for his bravery during this battle. Mirza Dildar Baig, also known as Khaki Shah, took part in the mutiny at Jhelum and was later celebrated by Indian Nationalists. He was captured and arrested with the remaining mutineers by authorities in Kashmir and later hanged near the river Jhelum. His grave is in a shrine in Jhelum Dildarnagar, and a small town in Uttar Pradesh is also named after him.

The railway bridge on the river Jhelum was built in 1873 by the British engineer William St. John Galwey. He also made the great Empress Bridge over the river Sutlej.

Independence
The predominantly Muslim population supported Muslim League and Pakistan Movement. After the independence of Pakistan in 1947, the minority Hindus and Sikhs migrated to India while Muslim refugees from India settled down in the Jhelum District.

Administration

As well as being district capital, Jhelum city is also the headquarters of Jhelum Tehsil, the city of Jhelum is administratively subdivided into seven union councils: Jhelum-I, Jhelum-II, Jhelum-III, Jhelum-IV, Jhelum-V, Jhelum-VI and Jhelum-VII.

Demography

The population of the Jhelum city is about 188,800 (2012) and it is the 32nd largest city of Pakistan with respect to population. Population density is 261/km. Population growth rate is 1.51 which is very low as compared to other urban areas of Pakistan. The majority of the population i.e. 98.47 percent is Muslim. Among the minorities Christians are in the majority sharing 1.36 percent in the district.

The literacy rate of Jhelum is among the highest in Pakistan. At 79%, it is only lower than that of Islamabad and neighbouring Rawalpindi. Somewhat higher than the literacy in Punjab province (58 percent). The literacy rate has remarkably increased from 38.9 percent in 1981. The rate is much higher in the urban areas for both males and females. 84% of the population have electricity and 96% have access to water. Human Development Index of Jhelum is 0.770, which is highest in Pakistan after Karachi.

Geography and climate
Lying at 32°56′ North latitude and 73°44′ East longitude, Jhelum is located a 1-hour and 30 minutes drive from the Capital of Pakistan Islamabad, and 3 hours drive from the heart of Punjab Lahore. Jhelum is linked with these cities through the National Highway N-5. Several cities are within 1 to 2 hours drive including Gujrat (home to fan manufacturing), Gujranwala, Chakwal and Mirpur, Azad Kashmir.

Jhelum has a monsoon-influenced humid subtropical climate (Köppen climate classification Cwa) and is extremely hot and humid in summer, and cold and generally dry in winter. Nevertheless, in the rainy season water torrents flow from the north to the Jhelum River very rapidly and cause damage to the crops, bridges, roads. This is responsible for the soil erosion in the district.

Over the years, global climate change has affected Jhelum as well as any other place on Earth and below comparison charts from Weatherbase and NOAA show the difference in rainfall between 1990 and 2015:

Major floods
The biggest floods in Jhelum in recent years were in 1992. Jhelum city and surrounding areas were almost completely submerged under flood waters.

Important sites

Rohtas Fort is a garrison fort built by the great Afghan king Sher Shah Suri. This fort is about 4 km in circumference. Qila Rohtas is situated in a gorge approximately 18 km NW of Jhelum and 7 km from Dina.

The old city has a labyrinth of narrow streets and bazaars. Opposite the CMH Jhelum Cantt is located the CMH Masjid Jhelum mosque.

Located in the cantonment area is the St. John's Church Jhelum which was built in 1860. There was a local stadium near Gul Afshan Colony which was changed to a cricket stadium named Zamir Jaffri Cricket Stadium. Altaf Park which was constructed in 1994–95 is in a very close proximity of Cricket Stadium. Nearly 100 m from Shandar Chowk, in the center of city, is Major Akram Shaheed Memorial Park. Major Muhammad Akram Memorial Library is also present in this park. This is also a site of a parade which takes place every year on 6 September at the occasion of Defence Day.

Lehri Nature Park is located 10 kilometers away from G. T. Road between Jhelum and Islamabad, it is 30 kilometers from Jhelum and 90 kilometers from Islamabad in the hilly Pothohar region.

It was constructed in 1967 across the Jhelum River. There is the Mangla View Resort that is the first planned resort development in Pakistan to offer residences, villas, townhouses, hotels, serviced apartments and retail outlets. The resort is located on a 340-acre (1.4 km2) site on the Mangla Dam area.

Rasul Barrage is located on the Jhelum River about 30 km downstream from Jhelum. Two major water canals originate at the Rasul barrage, Rasul-Qadirabad link canal which is also called Lower-Jhelum link canal and Rasul-Shahpur branch canal. The area around the Rasul Barrage lake is also a picnic spot.

Travel and tourism

Local
Auto Rickshaws are a common mode of transport for short routes within the city. Many of the new rickshaws in the city use Compressed natural gas (CNG) instead of the petrol engines as CNG is environmentally clean and cheaper than petrol. Rickshaws are another important mode of transportation. The older horse drawn tongas are now defunct although some can still be privately commissioned. Taxis and privately commissioned small passenger carrying vans are available.

National

Daewoo Express Bus Service and other bus services operate from the city to the entire country.

Railway

The Jhelum Railway Station was built in 1928 during British rule before the independence of Pakistan. It was connected by the North-Western Railway to other cities in the Indian empire. Jhelum is on main line of Pakistan Railways, and linked to whole country through Railway line across Pakistan.

Air
The nearest international airport is the Islamabad International Airport, which is approximately 110 km by road from Jhelum. The Sialkot International Airport, is approximately 100 km by road from Jhelum. A small airport called Gurha Salim Airport is situated 13 km (8 mi) from the city centre. It is not being used by any commercial airlines, but only for military purposes.

Telecommunication
3G & 4G Internet Service is available in this city since September 2014. The PTCL provides the main network of landline telephone with minority shares of few other operators like WorldCall. All major mobile phone companies operating in Pakistan provide service in Jhelum. Broadband internet access is available from DSL, EVDO to state of the art WiMAX technology from many ISPs, WiMax and WiFi operators like PTCL EVO, Wateen, Mobilink, WorldCall, and LinkdotNet. WorldCall has laid its fiberoptics throughout the city of Jhelum for future project of FTTH with Triple Play service. In August 2008 PTCL has launched its IPTV service named PTCL Smart TV in Jhelum. Jhelum has its own ISP Jhelum Networks which is a semi-public organisation working for the development of telecommunication and internet services throughout Jhelum. The company started its services in 2011 and now covering more than 200sq/km area. Jhelum Networks provides WiFi and cable internet services throughout the district. Different cellular networks also provide 3G internet in city Jhelum.

Sports

Located within the city is a golf course called the River-View Golf Club, where national golf tournaments are held regularly.

There is a cricket and football stadium, Zamir Jaffri Cricket Stadium, where district level tournaments are held. In October 2008, Pakistan Cricket Board upgraded this stadium for regional events.

Education
Jhelum has six degree colleges for women, six degree colleges for men, six co-education colleges, six commerce colleges, one law college, numerous higher secondary schools and over 150 high schools. It also has a campus Of Punjab University,s Punjab University Jhelum Campus, near Rathiyan, Kala Gujran and Satellite Town Jhelum.

Higher and technical education
In technical education there are three technical colleges, Government Institute of Technology (Chak Daulat), Government Vocational Institute for Women (Civil Lines Jhelum) and Government Technical Training Institute.

Universities

The University of the Punjab has established a campus in Jhelum offering programs related to business, commerce, law, and computer science. The new undergraduate and postgraduate degree programs are due to commence soon. The literacy rate of Jhelum is high in comparison to other cities of the Punjab. 65 kanals of land was allocated to establish this campus by Government of Punjab.

Jhelum also has two sub-campuses of the Virtual University of Pakistan, Virtual University Campus at Civil Lines opposite city Church, and a private virtual campus, Wings Institute of Learning. Virtual University of Pakistan inaugurated its own Campus in Jhelum in March 2012; VU Jhelum Campus is located in the middle of the city.

Hospitals

Jhelum has some of the largest hospitals in the area which include the hospital in the cantonment area of the city managed by the Pakistan Army or such organizations. One such hospital is the Combined Military Hospital Jhelum.

See also

 Inder Kumar Gujral, thirteenth Prime Minister of India
 Military College Jhelum
 Rabia Qari, the first female Muslim barrister in South Asia
 Rawalpindi
 Rawalpindi Division
 Potohar plateau
 List of colleges in Jhelum

References

External links

 Jhelum District official portal
 Jhelum Police website
 TMA Jhelum website
 Punjab Government website (Jhelum profile)

 
Populated places in Punjab, Pakistan
Cities in Punjab (Pakistan)